North Macedonian passports are issued to citizens of North Macedonia for the purpose of international travel. Responsibility for their issuance lies with the Ministry of the Interior. The validity of the passport is 5 years for persons 4 to 27 years of age and 10 years for those 27 years of age and older. For children ages four and under, the validity of the passport is limited to two years. The passports conform to the recommended standards (size, composition, layout, technology) of the International Civil Aviation Organization (ICAO), and are biometric passports.

History

From 1945 to 1991, when present-day North Macedonia was a constituent republic of Yugoslavia, citizens traveled with Yugoslav passports. Under the Yugoslav federal system, each republic had its own variety of passport; in particular, Yugoslav passports issued in SR Macedonia were printed in Macedonian and French, rather than in Serbo-Croatian.

The first post-independence passports were issued in 1991.
The design and contents have changed over the years. The first generation passports were blue with a silver color inscription without an emblem. The second generation of passports had a golden inscription on the cover and the third generation had the national coat of arms added. The first three generations had only "Република Мaкедонија" and the English translation "Republic of Macedonia" inscribed on the front cover.
The fourth generation passport became red with the French translation of the official country name, "République de Macédoine," added above and "Passeport" below the coat of arms. It was a biometric passport which contained a RFID chip, enabling the storage of biometric and other retrievable data. Previously issued, non-biometric passports remain valid until their stated dates of expiration.

Effective 16 November 2009, the five-pointed red star that had been part of the national coat of arms was removed from the emblem.

After the Prespa Agreement ending the naming dispute with Greece come into effect in February 2019, passports were stamped with the country's new name as an interim measure before new passports were issued. The trilingual stamp states “This passport is property of the Republic of North Macedonia” in English, French, and Macedonian. The authorities began issuing the passports with the new country name starting from 1 July 2021 (postponed from September 2020). Old name passports will remain valid until 12 February 2024.

Physical appearance
North Macedonian passports are burgundy in colour with the national coat of arms emblazoned in the centre of the front cover. The Macedonian words "Република Северна Македонија", optionally followed by the Albanian version "Republika e Maqedonisë së Veriut," the Turkish version "Kuzey Makedonya Cumhuriyeti," or any other recognized minority languages, as well as the English "Republic of North Macedonia" and the French "République de Macédoine du Nord" are inscribed above the coat of arms. The words "ПАСОШ," "PASAPORTË," "PASAPORT", "PASSPORT," and "PASSEPORT" are inscribed below. The passports have the standard biometric symbol at the bottom of the front cover. They contain 32 pages, with the critical information both printed on the data page and stored in the chip.

Integrated biodata card and signature page
Each passport has an integrated biodata card. 
An integrated biodata card has a visual zone and a machine-readable zone. The visual zone has a digitized photograph of the passport holder, data about the passport, and data about the passport holder:
 Type [of document, which is "P" for ordinary passports]
 Code [for the issuing state, which is "MKD" for North Macedonia]
 Passport No. 
 Surname (Macedonian Cyrillic Transcription with ICAO Standardized Transcription/Translation underneath)
 Name
 Nationality: македонско/граѓанин на Република Северна Македонија, Macedonian/citizen of the Republic of North Macedonia
 Date of birth (DD.MM.YYYY format)
 Unique Master Citizen Number (EMBG)
 Sex
 Place of birth
 Date of issue
 Authority [which is “MBP/MOI” – Ministry of Interior]
 Date of expiry
 Holder’s signature
 Holder's portrait
 Permanent residence
The integrated biodata card has a line for the signature of a passport holder. The non-biometric passports of the first three generations were not valid until they were signed by the holder. If a holder was unable to sign, it was to be signed by a person who had the legal authority to sign on their behalf. The new biometric passports only require a signature made with a digital pen on a tablet on the day of application, after which, the image of the signature is printed on the first page along with the other data and cannot be altered thereafter.

At the bottom of an integrated biodata card is the machine-readable zone, which can be read both visually and by an optical scanner. The machine-readable zone consists of two lines. There are no blank spaces in either line. A space which does not contain a letter or a number is filled with a "<".
The first line of a machine-readable zone of a passport contains a letter to denote the type of travel document ("P" for passport), the code for the issuing state (e.g., "MKD" for North Macedonia), and the name (surname first, then name) of the passport holder.

The second line of the machine-readable zone contains the passport number, supplemented by a check digit; the code of the nationality of the passport holder ("MKD" for North Macedonia); the date of birth of the passport holder (two digit year, two digit month, two digit day i.e. 800509), supplemented by a check digit; the sex of the passport holder ("M" or "F"); the date of expiry of the passport, supplemented by a check digit; the holder’s personal number, supplemented by a check digit; and, at the end of the line, an overall check digit.

Types of passports
Regular (Ordinary) passports - Issued to all citizens of North Macedonia. It has a red color and is valid for two, five, or ten years depending on the age of the applicant. These passports are not extendable or renewable and a new one must be obtained once expired.
Diplomatic passports - Issued to diplomats accredited overseas and their eligible dependents and to citizens who reside in North Macedonia and travel abroad for diplomatic work. The title and function of the bearer (Diplomat) is listed on the integrated biodata card in addition to the information already contained. It is valid for five years.
Official passports – Issued to government employees assigned overseas, government employees working at the Ministry of Foreign Affairs, or at a diplomatic mission abroad. An official passport can also be issued to other government officials that are to travel abroad, with prior approval, as well as to their spouses and children living in the same household. The title and function of the bearer (Official) is listed on the integrated biodata card in addition to the information already contained. It is valid for five years.
Temporary passports - Issued to citizens who need to return to the country from abroad and have extenuating circumstances such as a lost or stolen passport. When issued, it is valid for 30 days or until the return trip is completed. It can be issued at an embassy or consulate abroad.

Documents required
The following documents are required to obtain a passport:

Passport Application Form (Obtained from the MOI or downloaded from their website)
Valid State Issued ID (If citizen resides abroad, he/she needs to submit the foreign ID in order to prove identity)
Old passport (if applicable, regardless of expiry date) 
50 MKD Administrative Stamp
1500 MKD Processing Fee (4500 MKD for expedited processing – usually passport requests are processed and completed in 48 hours, and can only be picked up in Skopje, in the police station in the MRTV building)
Administrative tax Receipt (50 MKD for children 4 and under; 250 MKD for persons between the ages of 4 and 27 and 500 MKD for persons ages 27 and older).
Picture, fingerprints, and all biometric data are collected at the Passport Application Centre(s); fingerprint data is not collected from minors ages 12 and under.

Visa requirements

 North Macedonian citizens had visa-free or visa on arrival access (including eTAs) to 125 countries and territories, ranking the North Macedonian passport 45th in the world in terms of travel freedom according to the Henley Passport Index.

Gallery of historic images

See also
Visa requirements for citizens of North Macedonia
Identity card of North Macedonia
Driving licence in North Macedonia
Nationality law of North Macedonia
List of passports

External links
 Images of a 1994 passport from www.passportland.com
 Republic of North Macedonia : Biometric Passport (2010 — 2015) from www.PaperToTravel.com

Sources
 Republic of North Macedonia, Ministry of Foreign Affairs, Consular Services-Visa Regime
 Delta Visa & Passport Information
 Republic of North Macedonia, Ministry of Interior Administration, Travel Documents and Passports Law (in Macedonian)
 Republic of North Macedonia, Ministry of Interior Administration, Passport Application Form (in  Macedonian)
 Republic of North Macedonia, Ministry of Interior Administration, Passport Application Procedures (in Macedonian)

References

Passports by country
Law of North Macedonia